Dragon Quest: The Adventure of Dai was adapted into a forty-six episode anime series by Toei Animation and aired on TBS from October 17, 1991 to September 24, 1992. Despite no official Japanese DVD release, the show reran in 2007 on Toei's channel with a new master. The series uses two pieces of theme music, both composed by Koichi Sugiyama and performed by Jirou Dan.  is used for the opening theme, while , which was the original ending theme for Dragon Quest II, is used for the episodes' ending theme. The series adapts the events of the first 10 volumes of the manga, with initial plans to continue onward until scheduling and time slot changes at TBS lead to the series ending after 46 episodes. To accommodate the abrupt ending, Sanjo helped to provide an adjusted finale to the anime.

On January 6, 2020, the whole series was released in Japan for distribution on several video on demand (VOD) services, the first time the series has become officially available after the VHS release of the 1990s. In March 2020 it was announced that the 1991 anime will be getting a Blu-ray Box for the first time, released on July 3, 2020. The set contained all 46 episodes, and the 3 Jump Festa short anime films, (including the first film never before released on home video) which have been scanned from their original 35 mm negatives with high resolution and recorded as high-quality full HD remastered images.


Episode list

See also

 Dragon Quest: The Adventure of Dai (2020 TV series)

References

Dragon Quest: The Adventure of Dai
Dragon Quest: The Adventure of Dai